Nicolaas Vlok Cilliers  (born 26 March 1968) is a South African former rugby union player. After his playing years, he became a kicking coach.

Playing career
Cilliers represented  at the 1987 Craven Week tournament for schoolboys and in 1988, while receiving his police training, he played for 's under–20 team.

Cilliers made his test debut for the Springboks in 1996 during the second test against  at Kings Park in Durban.

Test history

See also
List of South Africa national rugby union players – Springbok no. 637
List of South Africa national rugby sevens players

References

1968 births
Living people
South African rugby union players
South Africa international rugby union players
SWD Eagles players
Western Province (rugby union) players
Free State Cheetahs players
South Africa international rugby sevens players
People from Karoo Hoogland Local Municipality
Rugby union players from the Northern Cape
Rugby union fly-halves
Rugby union wings